Balmorhea (pronounced bal-mə-ray) is a six-piece minimalist instrumental ensemble  from Austin, Texas, that was formed in 2006 by Rob Lowe and Michael Muller. Balmorhea were influenced by William Ackerman, The Six Parts Seven, Tortoise, Rachel's, Gillian Welch, Max Richter, Arvo Pärt and John Cage.

History

The band self-released their first album, self-titled Balmorhea in April 2007, and their second album Rivers Arms in February 2008, and released a limited EP in the fall of 2008. The group released their third full-length album, All is Wild, All is Silent on Western Vinyl Records. Their fourth full-length album, Constellations, was released in February 2010 on Western Vinyl, and their fifth, Stranger, was released late October 2012. The band released the Heir 7" in 2014 as a companion to the re-release of their 2007 eponymous debut. 

The song "Bowsprit," from the album Constellations, was used as the opening theme for the SundanceTV television series Rectify, and the song "Remembrance" from the album All Is Wild, All Is Silent was used within the 2015 Turkish film Delibal.

Balmorhea, called "an exemplary experiment in restraint" by The New Yorker, has toured the US and Europe eight times each, including shows with Tortoise, Thurston Moore, Fleet Foxes, Mono, CocoRosie, Sharon Van Etten, Damien Jurado, Efterklang, This Will Destroy You, and others. Additionally the band has performed at Austin City Limits Music Festival, SXSW, Fun Fun Fun Fest, and the Hopscotch Festival among others. Their music has been featured and reviewed by Pitchfork, BBC, Paste, Interview Magazine, NME, The Wall Street Journal, NPR, The Atlantic, and many more.

Members

Current
Aisha Burns – violin, vocals
 Rob Lowe – guitar, piano
 Michael Muller – guitar, bass guitar
 Jeff Olson – drums, vibraphone
 Sam Pankey – double bass, bass guitar
 Nino Soberon – cello, guitar

Past
 Mike Bell – drums
 Bruce Blay – drums
 Travis Chapman – double bass, bass guitar
 Kendall Clark – drums, vibraphone
 Jacob Glenn-Levin – bass guitar
 Nicole Kern – cello
 Erin Lance – cello
 Dylan Rieck – cello
 Taylor Tehan – drums
 Dave Wiley – cello

Discography

Studio albums
 Balmorhea (2007)
 Rivers Arms (2008)
 All Is Wild, All Is Silent (2009)
 Guest Room (2009) Soundtrack short movie
 Constellations (2010)
 Stranger (2012)
 Clear Language (2017)
 The Wind (2021)

EPs
 Tour EP (2008)

Remix albums
 All Is Wild, All Is Silent Remixes (2009)
 Candor / Clamor Remixes (2010)
 Clear Language Reworked (2018)

Live albums
 Live at Sint-Elisabethkerk (2011)

Singles
 Candor / Clamor (2010)
 Heir (2014)
 Chime / Shone (2018)
 The Most Fleeting (2018)

References

External links
Official website

Indie rock musical groups from Texas
American post-rock groups
Deutsche Grammophon artists
Musical groups established in 2006
2006 establishments in Texas
Western Vinyl artists